Spilosoma hercules is a moth in the family Erebidae. It was described by Hervé de Toulgoët in 1956. It is found on Madagascar.

It has a solid yellow body and wings, with black stripes on the abdomen.

References

Moths described in 1956
hercules